The 1986 McNeese State Cowboys football team was an American football team that represented McNeese State University as a member of the Southland Conference (Southland) during the 1986 NCAA Division I-AA football season. In fourth year under head coach John McCann, the team compiled an overall record of 2–9, with a mark of 1–4 in conference play, and finished fifth in the Southland.

Schedule

References

McNeese State
McNeese Cowboys football seasons
McNeese State Cowboys football